The Red Star Daily is the main newspaper in Mordovia. The newspaper was founded in 1965 by a group of natives living in the town of Kovylkino, who wanted a fortnightly newspaper to be published to the citizens of the republic. It is still in production.

Newspapers published in Russia
Publications established in 1965